Buena Vista Social Club at Carnegie Hall is a live album by Buena Vista Social Club. The double album documents the band's complete performance at Carnegie Hall, New York City, on July 1, 1998. The album was produced by guitarist Ry Cooder and released ten years after its recording, on October 13, 2008, through World Circuit.

The performance featured veteran Cuban performers such as Ibrahim Ferrer, Ruben González, Compay Segundo, and Omara Portuondo. Parts of the concert were featured in Wim Wenders' Oscar-nominated documentary, also called Buena Vista Social Club.

In 2009, it was awarded a gold certification from the Independent Music Companies Association which indicated sales of at least 100,000 copies throughout Europe.  As of March 2015 it has sold 47,000 copies in United States.

Track listing
Disc one

 "Chan Chan" - 4:45
 "De camino a la vereda" – 4:58
 "El cuarto de Tula" – 8:00 
 "La engañadora" – 2:44
 "Buena Vista Social Club" – 5:59
 "Dos gardenias" – 4:23
 "Quizás, quizás, quizás" – 3:47
 "Veinte años" – 4:06

Disc two

 "Orgullecida" – 3:23 
 "¿Y tú qué has hecho?" – 3:33
 "Siboney" – 2:32
 "Mandinga" – 5:29
 "Almendra" – 5:49
 "El carretero" – 5:38
 "Candela" – 7:00
 "Silencio" - 4:55

See also
List of number-one Billboard Tropical Albums from the 2000s

Notes 

2008 live albums
Buena Vista Social Club live albums
Nonesuch Records live albums
World Circuit (record label) live albums
Spanish-language live albums
Albums produced by Ry Cooder
Albums recorded at Carnegie Hall